The VBTP-MR Guarani (Portuguese" Viatura Blindada Transporte de Pessoal – Média de Rodas; "Armored Personnel Carrier Vehicle – Medium Wheeled Type") is a 6×6 armoured personnel carrier developed by Iveco and the Brazilian Army as part of its "Urutu-III" modernization program aimed to replace all EE-11 Urutu by 2015. The 8x8 version of the VBTP-MR is the base of Iveco's Superav armoured personnel carrier.

History
In 1999, the Brazilian Army issued a request (ROB #09/99) for a new family of armored fighting vehicles with amphibious capabilities to replace the EE-9 Cascavel and EE-11 Urutu. The main feature of this new family should be its modular design, allowing the incorporation of different turrets, weapons, sensors and communications systems onto the same carriage. The development program also include a communications version, an ambulance version and different fire support versions, armed with large calibre mortar and gun systems.

The Brazilian Army has signed with Iveco a contract worth about €2.5 billion for supplying armoured personnel carriers of the VBTP-MR model. The vehicles will replace the old Urutu armoured vehicle employed today by the Brazilian armed forces. The contract covers the delivery of 2,044 vehicles and logistical support for a period of 20 years. Deliveries are expected to begin in 2012, and continue for 18 years.

There is also an 8×8 variant of the vehicle.

Versions

As of 2021 the VBTP-MR has several planned variants of which the VBTP armored personnel carrier has entered production and service, while the rest are under development:

 VBTP (armored personnel carrier) 
 VBCI (infantry fighting vehicle with 30mm turret)
 VBE PC (command post)
 VBC-MRT (mortar carrier, possibly 120mm)
 VBR MR (105 mm cannon) 
 VBE CDT (fire control)
 VBE COM (communications / command and control) 
 VBE OFN (workshop)
 VBE SOC (armored recovery vehicle)
 VBTE AMB (ambulance)
 VBE ENG (engineering)

The requirements for the VBTP-MR VBCI included an ELBIT remote control turret, equipped with a Mk44 Bushmaster II cannon and a 7.62mm machine gun; it should also be able fire anti-tank guided missiles. This turret, capable of 360 degree swivel and elevation / depression of -15 to +60 degrees, was chosen by the Brazilian Army on a selection made from among four companies. It is expected to be manufactured in Brazil. The firing system has a laser rangefinder, vision and fire control by day/night thermal vision, double shot of command (commander and gunner of the car, with precedence for the later), automatic target tracking system, and hunter killer smoke launchers. A significant aspect of this vehicle is that the turret is equipped with weapons sights and it is stabilized in two axes, allowing firing on the move with very high probability of hit within the first shot. Future needs will determine what kind of instruments will equip the turret, possibly after the vehicle enters service.

Some speculate that the VBE / CP version will fashion a battle management system. The first level at which information must flow in a bidirectional way, what is known as "situational awareness", refers to the tactical commander. The distress (probably the VBCI) and reconnaissance models are planned to have an 8×8 drive train.

In September 2021, the Brazilian Army launched a test campaign of a new engineering variant. The unit is equipped with an excavator manipulator arm (EMA), earth anchor blade (EAB) and a straight obstacle blade (SOB) systems, supplied by the British company Pearson Engineering Ltd.

Armament

 UT-30BR turret by Elbit Systems, which will be produced in Brazil by AEL Sistemas S.A (Aeroeletronica). (30 mm autocannon)
 REMAX turret by Ares Aeroespacial e Defesa S.A. and CTEx. (.50 machine gun)
 possibly a 120 mm mortar (mortar version)
 possibly a 105 mm cannon (reconnaissance version)

Export
Compared to the model in use today by the Brazilian Army, the new project brings advantages such as upgraded armor protection, increased mobility, increased range, independent hydropneumatic suspension, increased protection against mines, better ergonomics, air conditioning, brake system with double disc and ABS, GPS, automatic detection and extinguishing of fire, night operation capability as standard and laser detection system.

According to Waldemir Cristino General Romulo, Military Project Manager, there is an interest in exporting the VBTP-MR to other markets, because Brazil has already sold vehicles to Latin America, Africa and Asia-Pacific in the past. The Argentine Army expressed interest in an 8×8 version. Armies also from Chile, Colombia and Ecuador showed interest in the Guarani.

First orders

On the 26 November 2009, the Brazilian Defence Minister, Nelson Jobim, announced that President Lula had authorized the start of production for 2044 new vehicles with the new name Guarani, formerly known as Urutu III. According to him the new vehicle would replace the entire mobility system of the Brazilian Army. Also according to the minister,  $6 billion would be invested in construction for the Guarani  over 20 years. It was predicted that the first vehicle would be ready in 2010 and 16 vehicles would be tested by 2011. From 2012 on, the actual production would begin.

The army commander, General Enzo Martins Peri, signed the contract for the manufacture of vehicles on 18 December 2009. The examinations would be held at Army's test range (CAEx), located in Barra de Guaratiba, west of Rio de Janeiro state. The tests would examine the vehicle durability, ergonomics and armour in situation such as landmine explosions,

Only on 7 August 2012, the Brazilian Army signed a contract to produce 86 Guarani. The order was completed by December 2012.

In March 2014, the 33rd Motorized Infantry Battalion of the 15th Mechanized Infantry Brigade will receive the first 13 vehicles. It will be the first regular army unit to be issued the new vehicle. It will be part of trials using the initial 86 vehicles to figure out doctrine for its use in service.

In service

In 2018 the 30th Mechanized Infantry Battalion in Uberlandia-MG received 30 armored vehicles VBTP-MR Guarani.

In 2020, The 14th Mechanized Cavalry Regiment of São Miguel do Oeste also received ten VBTP-MR Guarani equipped with the Remax tower.

In 2021 the 11th Mechanized Infantry Brigade, in Campinas-SP, was equipped with more than 126 armored vehicles VBTP-MR Guarani. In July, the first units of the Brazilian Army in the northeast of the country started to receive the first Guarani vehicles, an example of the 10th Mechanized Cavalry Squadron of the 11th Infantry Brigade.

On August 4, 2021, it was the turn of the 41st Motorized Infantry Battalion, it becomes the newest military organization to be equipped with the armored personnel transport vehicle, medium on wheels (VBTP-MSR) 6X6 Guarani, with the receipt of eight units, all with SARC REMAX.

Operators

 
 Brazilian Army: 600+, Deliveries started in December 2012 four pre-series and 50 purchased.  86 units were ordered in December 2012, with 2,044 units of the 6x6 variant total ordered (finish by 2030).
 
 Ghana Army: 11 ordered in July 2021 equipped with REMAX turret.
 
 Lebanese Army: 10 units ordered in 2015.
 
 Philippine Army - Elbit Systems won the Wheeled Armored Personnel Carrier Acquisition Project of the Philippine Army and is set to deliver 28 units of the Guarani 6x6 APC. The contract was signed for USD$47 million.

Potential operators
 
 Participated in a tender against the Chinese Norinco VN-1 and the American Stryker. Argentina has officially declared its aim to buy 156 Guarani armored vehicles produced in Brazil, having signed a letter of intent on 2022 December 23.

 Ciro Nappi reported that the Guarani will participate in a tender to replace the Condor and SIBMAS AFSV90 against the K806, Anoa 2, LAVII and the FNSS Pars.

Gallery

References

External links

 Official website
 VBTP-MR Technical Data Sheet and pictures

Amphibious armoured personnel carriers
Armoured personnel carriers of Brazil
Armoured personnel carriers
Wheeled armoured personnel carriers
Armoured personnel carriers of the post–Cold War period
Wheeled amphibious armoured fighting vehicles
Iveco vehicles
Six-wheeled vehicles
Military vehicles introduced in the 2010s